Altagonum grossuloides is a species of ground beetle in the subfamily Carabinae. It was described by Darlington in 1952.

References

grossuloides
Beetles described in 1952